Charles Hubbard Thompson (June 19, 1891 – June 13, 1964) was a ragtime pianist and composer.

Born in St. Louis, Missouri, he was given some piano lessons in his youth, though he later described himself as self-taught. He left St. Louis in 1911 to tour in Ohio and Indiana. In 1912, he met James P. Johnson in either Washington D.C or Coney Island. Thompson also played in Buffalo, New York, Detroit, Cleveland, Toledo, Erie/Pennsylvania, and Atlantic City/New Jersey.

He won the great ragtime contest of 1916 in the Booker T. Washington Theatre of in St. Louis, with his composition "The Lily Rag". He defeated Tom Turpin, the owner of the theatre and the owner of the "Rosebud Club", where nearly all the great ragtimers of America met since 1900.

See also
 List of ragtime composers

References

External links
audio recording of Swanee Ripples Rag at the Library of Congress jukebox

Ragtime composers
1891 births
1964 deaths
20th-century composers